The Flight of Wally Funk is the fifth studio album by Australian rock band Spiderbait. Named after female aviator Wally Funk, the album was released in October 2001 and peaked at number 34 on the ARIA charts.

Track listing

Charts

Release history

References 

2001 albums
Spiderbait albums